Vidanelage Samantha Pathmachandra de Mel (born 12 December 1964) is a former Italian cricketer of Sri Lankan origin. A left-arm orthodox spinner, he played for the Italy national cricket team between 1996 and 1998, having previously played first-class cricket for Burgher Recreation Club and Sebastianites Cricket and Athletic Club in his native Sri Lanka.

Born in Colombo, de Mel started his career playing in his native Sri Lanka, playing eight first-class matches for Burgher Recreation Club in 1989, and four for Sebastianites Cricket and Athletic Club during the 1990–91 season.

He later moved to Italy, and first represented the national team there in the 1996 European Championship. He played in the 1997 ICC Trophy for Italy, and last played for them in the following years European Championship.

He was named in Italy's squad for the 2001 ICC Trophy, but Italy withdrew from the tournament due to a dispute over the eligibility of four players.

References

1965 births
Living people
Italian cricketers
Burgher Recreation Club cricketers
Sebastianites Cricket and Athletic Club cricketers
Sri Lankan emigrants to Italy
Sri Lankan cricketers